Richard Lehoux  (born 1956) is a Canadian politician who has served as the member of Parliament (MP) for Beauce since 2019, as a member of the Conservative Party. Prior to his election to the House of Commons, Lehoux was the mayor of Saint-Elzear from 1998 to 2017 and the reeve of Nouvelle-Beauce Regional County Municipality from 2000 to 2017.

Personal and professional life
Lehoux was born in 1956. His family has been in Beauce for eight generations. His great-grandfather served as mayor of Saint-Elzear from 1898 to 1902, and he is a fourth-generation dairy farmer.

Political career

Municipal politics

Mayor of Saint-Elzéar and Reeve of Nouvelle-Beauce RCM 
Lehoux was the mayor of Saint-Elzéar, Quebec in the Chaudière-Appalaches region from 1998 to 2017, and the reeve of Nouvelle-Beauce RCM from 2000 to 2017.

Fédération québécoise des municipalités 
Lehoux was a member of the Fédération québécoise des municipalités (FQM) from 2001 to 2017. He was the vice president from 2010 to 2014 and briefly served as interim president in 2012. He was elected as the FQM's president in 2014 and held the role until 2017.

When the FQM founded the Mutuelle des municipalités du Québec (MMQ) in 2003, Lehoux served as vice president. He would also serve as MMQ president from 2017 to 2018.

Federal politics
Lehoux retired from municipal politics in 2017 to return to his dairy farm, but returned to politics in November 2018 as the Conservative candidate for the 2019 Canadian federal election in the Beauce riding, with the support (amongst others) of party leader Andrew Scheer.

Lehoux was elected to Parliament following the 2019 election, unseating incumbent Maxime Bernier, who formerly held the seat for the Conservatives, but resigned to form the libertarian-right People's Party of Canada (PPC). He was re-elected in the 2021 election.

Electoral record

References

Living people
Conservative Party of Canada MPs
Members of the House of Commons of Canada from Quebec
21st-century Canadian politicians
1956 births
People from Beauce, Quebec
Mayors of places in Quebec